Derrick Osei Kuffour Prempeh popularly called Kofi Jamar is a Ghanaian musician from Kumasi. He is best known for his hit song Ekorso which evolved from the viral Kumerica/Asaaka trend and features Yaw Tog and YPee. In 2021, he was in nomination in seven categories at the Vodafone Ghana Music Awards but won none.

Early life and education 
Jamar is from Bantama in the Ashanti Region of Ghana. He attended Bethel Preparatory School together with fellow rapper Amerado.

Concerts
 He performed at the 17th Ghana Party in the Park UK Concert.
He performed at the Ghana Music Awards UK in October 2021.

References 

Living people
1995 births